Frederick Blair Stanley (born August 13, 1947) is an American former professional baseball shortstop, who played in Major League Baseball (MLB) from 1969 to 1982 for the Seattle Pilots / Milwaukee Brewers, Cleveland Indians, San Diego Padres, New York Yankees, and Oakland Athletics. While with the Yankees, he won two World Series championships, back to back in 1977 and 1978, both over the Los Angeles Dodgers. Stanley currently serves as the Director of Player Development for the San Francisco Giants.

Career
Nicknamed "Chicken," Stanley was a key backup to Bucky Dent of the Yankees teams in the late 1970s and was a part of the Yankees championship teams in both 1977 and 1978. Stanley was a favorite player of Phil Rizzuto, who did the color analysis for the Yankees during this timeframe. On September 8, 1973, Stanley hit the last grand slam at the original Yankee Stadium.

Since 1960, no other non-pitcher has had as many seasons (nine) with at least 30 at-bats and five or fewer extra base hits.

On October 12, 2007, Stanley was appointed as the Giants' Director of Player Development. Prior to that, he held several positions in the Giants' organization, including spending 2000–2004 as a minor league manager. In 2001, Stanley managed the Salem-Keizer Volcanoes to the league championship of the Northwest League.

Stanley was the last active player in the major leagues to have played for the short-lived Seattle Pilots franchise.

References

External links

Appointment as the SF Giants Director of Player Development

1947 births
Living people
Arizona Instructional League Pilots players
Baseball players from Iowa
Bismarck-Mandan Pards players
Cleveland Indians players
Dallas–Fort Worth Spurs players
Florida Instructional League Astros/Senators players
Major League Baseball executives
Major League Baseball shortstops
Milwaukee Brewers coaches
Milwaukee Brewers players
Minor league baseball coaches
Minor league baseball managers
New York Yankees players
Oakland Athletics players
Oklahoma City 89ers players
Portland Beavers players
Salisbury Astros players
San Diego Padres players
Savannah Senators players
San Francisco Giants executives
Seattle Pilots players
St. Lucie Legends players
Syracuse Chiefs players
Wichita Aeros players
Salem-Keizer Volcanoes